Adrian Webster may refer to:

 Adrian Webster (footballer, born 1980), New Zealand international football (soccer) player
 Adrian Webster (footballer, born 1951), English football (soccer) player